Ubirajara Fidalgo da Silva, known as Ubirajara Fidalgo (June 22, 1949 – July 3, 1986), was a Brazilian actor, director, theatrical producer, playwright and founder of the black professional theater Teatro Profissional do Negro (TEPRON. He was a social activist in Afro-Brazilian politics ( "Movimento Negro").

Biography
Ubirajara Fidalgo started his career yet teenager in his hometown Caxias municipality in the state of the Maranhão and died in Rio de Janeiro on 3 July 1986.

Philosophy of TEPRON
At the age of 18, Fidalgo moved to Rio de Janeiro and two years later (in 1970) founded The Black Professional Theater. Fidalgo's goal was to insert Black artists into the performing arts field. He included Black artists from all walks of life, including many young people from disadvantaged neighborhoods. They worked along with professional actors to form Fidalgo's company. The philosophy of TEPRON was to address the "questao negra (black question)" on Brazilian stages. The 'Black Question' on the streets and in institutions, was drowned out by the cries of "racial democracy " reinforced by the then military dictatorship. Instead of focusing on racial differences and looking at groups' needs separately, the military government wanted to view Brazilian society as one where everyone was equal, irrespective of ethnic background whether this was realistic or not.

Although its first production was William Shakespeare's 'Othello', the company went on to perform works written by Fidalgo that conveyed political messages. This trend started with a monologue titled 'Desfuga' that was performed in the early 1980s. According to the original advertisement of the show, Desfuga, "portrays the racial problem of the black Brazilian , invoked by conflicts caused by miscegenation and paternalistic education that distorts the real interests of the colored man." After the performance, Fidalgo welcomed distinguished guests from the audience like politicians, artists, researchers, social activists and students into a discussion with him. These post-play discussions continued and offered a space for political, social and racial issues to be dissected within the Afro-Brazilian community. The company's success was reflected by three main productions, "Desfuga", "Fala pra eles Elisabete" and "Os Gazeteiros". All three productions remained in theatre for three years after they were performed by the company in the 1970s. Ultimately, TEPRON offered a space for talent to be cultivated within the black community. Fidalgo helped to advance the black identity in theatre while educating society on issues like homophobia, racism, misogyny, and the military dictatorship. Today, TEPRON remains significant in Brazilian history and the advancement of Brazilian theater.

Plays
 Talk to them Elisabete ("Fala pra Eles Elisabete")
 The Gazeteiros ("Os Gazeteiros")
 Tuti
 The Lapa's Doll ("A Boneca da Lapa")
 Bambi's Son

References

External links
 :pt:Ubirajara Fidalgo
 :pt:Ubirajara Fidalgo
http://www.brasileiros-na-alemanha.com/portal/index.php?option=com_content&view=article&id=240:personalidade-ubirajara-fidalgo&catid=111:voce-no-bna-perfis-e-entrevistas&Itemid=210

Brazilian artists
1949 births
1986 deaths
20th-century Brazilian male actors